Wewak Airport , also known as Boram Airport, is an airport in Wewak, Papua New Guinea.

Airlines and destinations

References

External links
 

Airports in Papua New Guinea
East Sepik Province